Scott Andrew Frost  (born January 4, 1975) is an American football coach.  He was the head football coach at the University of Nebraska–Lincoln from 2018 to 2022. Born in Lincoln, Nebraska, Frost played college football as a quarterback for the Stanford Cardinal and the Nebraska Cornhuskers, the latter of which he led to a shared national championship in 1997. He played six years in the NFL, mostly on special teams.

After retiring as a player, Frost served as an assistant coach for a number of college football teams, most notably as the offensive coordinator for the Oregon Ducks from 2013 to 2015, where he helped coach Heisman trophy-winner Marcus Mariota and the 2014 Oregon Ducks to a berth in the first college football playoff, where they lost to Ohio State in the national championship game.

Frost was subsequently hired as the head coach at the University of Central Florida (UCF), where he coached for two seasons. After an inaugural season of 6–7 in 2016, Frost's 2017 UCF Knights posted a 13–0 record, winning the American Athletic Conference championship and defeating the Auburn Tigers in the Peach Bowl. The Colley Matrix recognized the 2017 UCF team as national champions, and the school claims a national title despite not winning the college football playoff. The NCAA openly recognizes UCF as co-champs with Alabama in the official record book. This remains Frost's only winning season as a head coach.

In December 2017, Frost accepted the head coaching position at his alma mater, the University of Nebraska. Frost's coaching record at Nebraska was 16–31, with a 10–26 record in the Big Ten Conference, a 5–22 record in games decided by eight points or less, and an 0–14 record against ranked opponents. Nebraska fired Frost three games into the 2022 season after an upset loss at home against Georgia Southern.

High school
Born in Lincoln, Nebraska, Frost attended Wood River High School in Wood River, Nebraska from 1989 to 1993. In four years as the team's starting quarterback, he threw for 6,859 yards and 67 touchdowns and rushed for 4,278 yards and 72 touchdowns. He led his team to the state playoffs in his sophomore, junior, and senior seasons. In those three postseason appearances, Frost's teams won five games and twice made it to the state semi-finals. Both of Frost's parents, Larry and Carol Frost, coached his high school football team.

In addition to football, Frost was a standout in track and field, winning a state championship in the shot put.

College career
Frost began his collegiate career as a two-year letterman at Stanford in 1993 and 1994, playing for Bill Walsh, before transferring to Nebraska in 1995 to play for Tom Osborne. In his two seasons starting for Nebraska, Frost quarterbacked his teams to a 24–2 record, completing 192 of 359 passes for 2,677 yards and 18 touchdowns, including a senior season in which he became the first Nebraska player and only the tenth player in college football history to both run (1,095) and pass (1,237) for 1,000 yards, also setting school records for rushing touchdowns (19) and yards. He was the 1996 Big 12 Offensive Newcomer of the Year and a 1997 Johnny Unitas Golden Arm Award finalist.

Frost's senior season featured a notable Flea Kicker play in a game against Missouri, where he threw a pass that was inadvertently kicked by Shevin Wiggins and caught by Matt Davison for a touchdown. The touchdown sent the game into overtime where Frost sealed No. 1 Nebraska's victory with a rushing touchdown. Frost and Nebraska went on to defeat Peyton Manning's Tennessee Volunteers in the 1998 Orange Bowl and claim a share of the 1997 national championship. Frost graduated from Nebraska with a B.A. in finance.

Statistics

Professional football career

Following his collegiate career, Frost was selected in the third round (67th overall) of the 1998 NFL Draft by the New York Jets as a safety. As a rookie in 1998, Frost played in 13 games mostly on special teams, making six tackles and two passes defended. In 1999, Frost played in 14 games with seven tackles. Playing in all 16 games in 2000, Frost made his first career start against the Buffalo Bills on October 29. Frost also got his first career interception against Bills quarterback Rob Johnson on September 17 and first career sack against the Oakland Raiders' Rich Gannon on December 11.

The day after being waived by the Jets, Frost signed with the Cleveland Browns on August 28, 2001. Frost played in 12 games mostly on special teams, making 16 tackles and a fumble recovery. The Browns waived Frost on December 10.

On December 19, 2001, Frost signed with the Green Bay Packers. However, due to injuries, he never appeared in any games for the Packers, and he was waived on December 17, 2002. In his final NFL season, Frost played in four games for the Tampa Bay Buccaneers in 2003.

Coaching career
In December 2002, while still on the Green Bay Packers' injured reserve list, Frost served as a temporary graduate assistant at his alma mater. He was later a graduate assistant at Kansas State in 2006. In 2007, he took a position at Northern Iowa as the linebackers coach, and in 2008 he was elevated to co-defensive coordinator. His defense finished the 2008 season tied for third in the FCS in takeaways (40) and ninth in scoring defense (17.7 points per game). The 12–3 Panthers also led the Missouri Valley Football Conference in rushing defense (107.1 yards per game) and scoring defense.

Oregon
On January 26, 2009, Frost joined the coaching staff at Oregon as the wide receivers coach, working under head coach Chip Kelly and offensive coordinator Mark Helfrich. During Frost's four seasons as the wide receivers coach, Oregon reached four straight BCS bowls and three of Frost's wide receivers were invited to NFL camps.

Following Chip Kelly's departure to the NFL to coach the Philadelphia Eagles, Oregon promoted Mark Helfrich to head coach and Frost was announced as the offensive coordinator and quarterbacks coach on January 31, 2013. In 2014, Frost was a finalist for the Broyles Award, given annually to the nation's top assistant coach. As the quarterbacks coach, he mentored Marcus Mariota, who won the Heisman Trophy, en route to a berth in the National Championship game. During Frost's three seasons as Oregon's offensive coordinator, the team recorded a 33–8 record and finished every year ranked among the nation's top six in both scoring offense and total offense.

UCF

On December 1, 2015, Frost was hired as the head football coach at the University of Central Florida. Frost replaced long time UCF head coach George O'Leary and interim head coach Danny Barrett, who took over the Knights when O'Leary resigned following an 0–8 start. The Knights went on to finish 0–12 that year. Frost immediately turned UCF around. He won six games in 2016, taking the Knights to the 2016 Cure Bowl, where they lost to Arkansas State. In 2017, the Knights stormed through the regular season, finishing 11–0. They won the AAC championship game 62–55 in double overtime at home against Memphis for their 12th consecutive win. Frost led the Knights into the 2018 Peach Bowl, the school's second-ever appearance in a major bowl. In that game, they defeated 7th ranked Auburn, completing the first undefeated and untied season in school history. Following the game, the school claimed a national championship which is recognized in the official NCAA record books.

Nebraska

On December 2, 2017, Frost accepted the head football coach position at his alma mater, the University of Nebraska–Lincoln. Despite immediate fanfare following Frost's arrival in Lincoln, including a commemorative state holiday in which Governor Pete Ricketts declared September 1 as "Scott Frost Day," Frost's 2018 Nebraska Cornhuskers began the season with six straight losses, the worst start to a football season in school history. Scott Frost finished his first season 4–8, the worst single season record of any Nebraska head football coach in more than fifty years. In his first four seasons as Nebraska's head coach, Frost's teams never played in a bowl game and failed to compete in the West Division of the Big Ten, never rising higher than fifth. Frost posted a record of 5–20 in games decided by 8 points or less, a 10–25 record in Big Ten Conference games, and an 0–14 record against ranked opponents. His 2021 Cornhuskers set a college football record with nine single-digit losses in a season.

On November 8, 2021, during Frost's fourth season, Nebraska Athletics Director Trev Alberts, himself a former player, announced a restructuring to Frost's contract, ending speculation on the coach's job status. Alberts indicated that Frost would return for the 2022 season, but with a salary reduced by $1 million and a lower buyout. On the same day of the announcement, Scott Frost dismissed four offensive coaching assistants: offensive line coach Greg Austin, running backs coach Ryan Held, offensive coordinator Matt Lubick, and quarterbacks coach Mario Verduzco.

Nebraska fired Frost on September 11, 2022, the day after Georgia Southern upset the Cornhuskers at home 45–42. Frost was owed a $16.4 million buyout. Due to a clause that came from restructuring his contract, Nebraska would have only owed Frost about $8.7 million if he was fired after October 1, 2022. It was the first time in 215 home games that Nebraska lost while scoring over 35 points. Mickey Joseph succeeded Frost as interim head coach.

Personal life
Scott is the son of long time high school football coach Larry Frost and former Olympic discus thrower Carol Frost. His brother, Steve Frost, was born on July 4, 1973, and played defensive line and long snapper at Stanford.

Head coaching record

References

Notes

External links

 Nebraska profile
 

1975 births
Living people
American football safeties
American football quarterbacks
Cleveland Browns players
Green Bay Packers players
Kansas State Wildcats football coaches
Nebraska Cornhuskers football coaches
Nebraska Cornhuskers football players
New York Jets players
Northern Iowa Panthers football coaches
Oregon Ducks football coaches
Stanford Cardinal football players
Tampa Bay Buccaneers players
UCF Knights football coaches
People from Hall County, Nebraska
Sportspeople from Lincoln, Nebraska
Coaches of American football from Nebraska
Players of American football from Nebraska